Jarmen-Tutow is an Amt in the Vorpommern-Greifswald district, in Mecklenburg-Vorpommern, Germany. The seat of the Amt is in Jarmen.

The Amt Jarmen-Tutow consists of the following municipalities:
Alt Tellin
Bentzin
Daberkow
Jarmen
Kruckow
Tutow
Völschow

References

Ämter in Mecklenburg-Western Pomerania